I Am Frigid... Why? is a 1972 French erotic film directed by Max Pécas.

Plot
After being initiated by force by Eric and Carla, incestuous brother and sister, Doris tries to  overcome her trauma living various sexual experiences...

Cast
 Sandra Julien : Doris
 Marie-Georges Pascal : Carla Chambon 
 Jean-Luc Terrade : Eric Chambon 
 Thierry Murzeau : Luc, Doris's lover
 Robert Lombard : Mr Chambom
 Arlette Poirier : Mrs Chambon 
 Georges Guéret : Doris's father
 Anne Kerylen : Eva
 Catherine Wagener : Léa 
 Virginie Vignon : Patricia
 Frédérique Aubrée : Lina 
 Joëlle Cœur :  Girl at the party

References

External links
 
 I Am Frigid... Why? at Encyclo-ciné (French)

Bibliography 
 Dictionnaire des films français pornographiques et érotiques en 16 et 35 mm, Serious Publishing 2011, Christophe Bier

1972 films
1970s erotic drama films
1970s French-language films
French erotic drama films
1972 drama films
1973 drama films
1973 films
1970s French films